The World Erotic Art Museum, located in the heart of the Miami Beach, Florida Art Deco District, is a museum, library, and education think tank that uses its collection to illustrate the history of erotic art. It contains the collection of Naomi Wilzig.

Collection
The collection includes sculptures, drawings, paintings, and photographs. The collection ranges from folk art to the work of famous artists. The Museum shows artwork from artists like Rembrandt, Picasso, Salvador Dalí, Fernando Botero as well as Robert Mapplethorpe, Helmut Newton and Bunny Yeager to name just a few out of more than 4000.

Exhibitions

In 2011 WEAM premiered the first US exhibition of rare erotic Rembrandt etchings belonging to the Barony of Fulwood Trust, the exhibition was curated by the Baron of Fulwood and Dirleton. In 2012 the curator Helmut Schuster arranged the first solo show of Helmut Newton in Florida in cooperation with the MDM in Salzburg.

Gallery

References

External links

Museums in Miami Beach, Florida
Art museums and galleries in Florida
Art museums established in 2005
2005 establishments in Florida
Sex museums in the United States
Sexuality in Florida